Kuai Yue (died 214), courtesy name Yidu, was an adviser to the warlord Liu Biao during the late Eastern Han dynasty of China. He was the younger brother of Kuai Liang. When Liu Biao died and Liu Cong succeeded him, Kuai Yue recommended that he surrender to Cao Cao. Cao Cao later praised Kuai Yue, saying, "I would rather obtain Kuai Yue than Jing Province."

See also
 Lists of people of the Three Kingdoms

References

 Chen, Shou (3rd century). Records of the Three Kingdoms (Sanguozhi).
 Pei, Songzhi (5th century). Annotations to Records of the Three Kingdoms (Sanguozhi zhu).

2nd-century births
214 deaths
Liu Biao and associates
Officials under Cao Cao
Politicians from Xiangyang
Han dynasty politicians from Hubei
Political office-holders in Hubei